The men's 94 kilograms event at the 2014 World Weightlifting Championships was held on 13–14 November 2014 in Baluan Sholak Sports Palace, Almaty, Kazakhstan.

Schedule

Medalists

Records

 Ilya Ilyin's world records were rescinded in 2016.

Results

References

Results 

2014 World Weightlifting Championships